See You Up There is a 2017 French drama film written and directed by and starring Albert Dupontel, adapted from the 2013 novel The Great Swindle (Au revoir là-haut in French) by Pierre Lemaitre.

Plot
In November 1918, a few days before the Armistice, Edouard Péricourt saves Albert Maillard's life. The two men have nothing in common but the war. Lieutenant Pradelle, by ordering a senseless assault, destroys their lives while binding them as companions in misfortune. On the ruins of the carnage of WWI, condemned to live, the two attempt to survive. Thus, as Pradelle is about to make a fortune with the war victims' corpses, Albert and Edouard mount a monumental scam with the bereaved families' commemoration and with a nation's hero worship.

Cast

 Albert Dupontel as Albert Maillard
 Nahuel Pérez Biscayart as Edouard Péricourt
 Laurent Lafitte as Captain Henri d'Aulnay-Pradelle 
 Niels Arestrup as President Marcel Péricourt
 Émilie Dequenne as Madeleine Péricourt
 Mélanie Thierry as Pauline
 Héloïse Balster as Louise
 Philippe Uchan as Labourdin
 André Marcon as The police officer
 Michel Vuillermoz as Joseph Merlin
 Kyan Khojandi as Dupré
 Carole Franck as Sister Hortense
 Philippe Duquesne as The station officer
 Éloïse Genet as Cécile
 Axelle Simon as Madame Belmont
 Denis Podalydès as The minister
 Gilles Gaston-Dreyfus as The mayor
 Jacques Mateu as The prefect
 Lia Catreux as Madame Péricourt (Edouard's mother)

Production
Movie production started in March 2016 in the region of the Vexin plateau over the Seine river valley.

Reception
On review aggregator Rotten Tomatoes, the film holds an approval rating of 93%, based on 15 reviews with an average rating of 7.5/10.

Jordan Mintzer from The Hollywood Reporter wrote that "the film features a handful of jaw-dropping moments — such as an excruciating battle across no man's land — held together by a strong cast, including BPM (Beats Per Minute) star Nahuel Perez Biscayart as a disfigured artist hidden behind an array of exquisitely ornamental masks. But condensing nearly 600 pages of story into a two-hour movie proves increasingly difficult as too many plot points take away from all the visual splendor, while the characters hardly have time to be drawn out." Peter Debruge writing for the Variety magazine said: "...simultaneously grand and eccentric, and though it sometimes struggles to sustain its identity amid such a strange mix of tones, the film holds together via DP Vincent Mathias’ dramatic widescreen lensing and a splendid, understated score from Christophe Julien." Jordi Costa from the Spanish newspaper El País stated: "Albert Dupontel knows that a black comedy doesn't only have to be cynical and his film finds its soul in the masks that communicate the emotions of one of his characters."

Accolades
See You Up There earned 13 nominations at the 43rd César Awards, winning 5 awards. The film also won other awards.

References

External links
 

2017 films
2010s French-language films
French drama films
Films directed by Albert Dupontel
French World War I films
Films whose director won the Best Director César Award
2017 drama films
Films based on French novels
Films set in 1918
2010s French films